The Audi Type T was a large, 6-cylinder-powered sedan/saloon car introduced by Audi in 1931. It was in most respects a scaled-down version of the manufacturer's Type SS "Zwickau", which had appeared two years earlier.

Jørgen Skafte Rasmussen, the Danish-born entrepreneurial industrialist who had purchased Audi-Werke in 1928, had previously, in 1927, purchased the manufacturing plant of the bankrupt Detroit-based Rickenbacker business and shipped it home to Germany. He installed it in a factory he owned just outside Zschopau, near to Audi's own Zwickau plant. The plan was to build large, relatively inexpensive US-style engines for sales to other German auto-makers. The plan failed in that Rasmussen failed to secure any orders for the engines, so he instead produced two models of his own which used engines produced using the Rickenbacker plant. The Audi Type T (Zwickau) was the second and smaller of these.

The vehicle had a six-cylinder engine with 3,838 cc of displacement.

The car had two leaf-sprung solid axles and four-wheel hydraulic brakes. It was available as four-door "Limousine" (sedan) or two-door convertible. 76 were made.

Specifications

Sources 
 Oswald, Werner: Deutsche Autos 1920–1945, Motorbuch Verlag Stuttgart, 10. Auflage (1996 edition), 
 

1930s cars
Type T